Sean Saves the World is an American sitcom television series created by Victor Fresco and starring Sean Hayes that aired on NBC from October 3, 2013, to March 24, 2014, as part of the 2013–14 American television season. It was announced on January 28, 2014, that Sean Saves the World had been cancelled after 13 episodes had aired. Of the 18 ordered, only 15 were filmed.

Plot
Sean is a divorced gay father with a successful, yet demanding, career. When his 14-year-old daughter moves in with him full-time, he is forced to juggle his work life, his mom, and fatherhood. Determined not to give life a half-hearted attempt, he reads up on parenting and about keeping a vibrant family alongside a thriving career. However, sudden work pressures dampen his grand family plans and skew his work/life balance.

Cast and characters

Main
Sean Hayes as Sean Harrison
Linda Lavin as Lorna Harrison, Sean's mother
Samantha Isler as Ellie Harrison, Sean's street-smart teenage daughter
Thomas Lennon as Max Thompson, Sean's temperamental new boss
Megan Hilty as Liz, Sean's best friend and co-worker
Echo Kellum as Hunter, Sean's co-worker and friend

Recurring
Stacy Keach as Lee Thompson, Max's arrogant, lustful father
Parvesh Cheena as Jerry, Max's loyal assistant

Notable guest stars
Craig Ferguson as Andrew Summer, Sean's ex-boss who he had a one night stand with
Portia de Rossi as Jill, Sean's ex-wife and Ellie's mom
Guy Pearce as Liam Stone, Max's fencing instructor who dates Sean

Hayes' Will & Grace co-star Megan Mullally was set to guest star in the seventeenth episode as Sean's sister; however, the episode was not produced due to the series' cancellation.

Development and production
The series first appeared as part of the NBC development slate in December 2012, with Sean Hayes attached to star. On January 22, 2013, NBC placed a pilot order under the title Happiness. The pilot was written by Victor Fresco and directed by James Burrows. Burrows had previously worked with Hayes on Will & Grace.

Casting announcements for the remaining series regular roles began in February 2013, with Linda Lavin cast in the role of Lorna, Sean's tough and assertive mother. Echo Kellum was the next actor cast in the series, in the role of Hunter, one of Sean's co-workers, who is very passionate about his music, art, photography and poetry. Thomas Lennon then joined the series in the role of Max, the new owner of the online retail company where Sean works. In late-February, Samantha Isler joined the cast as Ellie, Sean's quick-witted daughter. Shortly after, Lindsay Sloane boarded the series as Liz, Sean's co-worker and best friend, a former therapist. Vik Sahay later signed onto the series in the recurring role of Howard, a slightly aggressive IT guy, who works alongside Sean.

On May 9, 2013, NBC placed a series order, under the new title Sean Saves the World. Two days after the series order, Lindsay Sloane exited the role of Liz: Megan Hilty was cast soon after. On November 8, 2013, NBC ordered an additional five episodes for the first season, bringing the total to 18 episodes.

With few exceptions, Sean Saves the World was shot on a closed set with a laugh track added during post-production, a point several critics have derided. Jodi Walker from Entertainment Weekly commented on Hayes' animated performance — dubbing it "flailing" — by saying, "flailing is key to cueing this show’s laugh track." Matthew Gilbert of The Boston Globe commented, "why would we want their jokes to succeed or fail based on their own merit when a laugh track can tell us what is funny and exactly when to laugh?" Ed Bark of National TV Reviews & News added that "Hayes seems wedded to the old-time sitcom religion, which calls for multiple cameras...and a laugh track...his is the only NBC comedy series with such additives, but Hayes gets a bit snippy when asked if it’s a format he favors." Beginning with Episode 12 ("The Wrath of Sean"), a live studio audience is utilized for scenes taking place in Sean's apartment and workplace.

Episodes

Release and home media
On March 24, 2014, the last two filmed episodes became available on iTunes.

The entire series is available as a made-on-demand DVD set from Universal Studios Home Entertainment.

Reception
The show has received mixed reviews from critics. Glenn Garvin of The Miami Herald gave the series critical acclaim saying "Sean Saves the World is like a comedy cruise to self-discovery, with both Sean and his daughter learning of strengths and weaknesses they didn't know they had, the process punctuated with keenly funny dialogue and precision timing". David Hinckley of the New York Daily News gave the show 2 out of 5 stars.

References

External links
 
 

2010s American sitcoms
2013 American television series debuts
2014 American television series endings
2010s American LGBT-related comedy television series
English-language television shows
Gay-related television shows
Television series by Universal Television
Television shows set in Chicago
NBC original programming
Television series by Hazy Mills Productions
Television series created by Victor Fresco